Bilicenii Vechi is a commune in Sîngerei District, Moldova. It is composed of two villages, Bilicenii Vechi and Coada Iazului.

References

Communes of Sîngerei District